Aryapur Khera  is the village. Mainpuri city is an administrative headquarters of this village. Mainpuri is located to the north-east of Agra.

History

Aryapur Khera got its name due to his geographical location. The village is established since 16th–17th century. It was a business zone. Main business areas are Tambaqo (agricultural products), jewellery, potato, wheat and rice.
Village is famous for strong presence of Pandey Brahmins and sunar known for their extraordinary achievements since medieval period. Late Shri Banbarilal Sisodiya, Pt. Dammilal Pandey, and Shri Prabhakar Pandey was great freedom fighters from the Village who took part in Kakori Train Decoity and Mainpuri Conspiracy and were imprisoned for seven and five years jail terms respectively along with Ram Prasad Bismil and Pt. Gendalal Dixit.
Dammilal Pande from a wealthy zamindar family of village provide weapons to the revolutionaries. 

The village has produced many people who has served on high government positions. 
In order to get the British out of the country during the freedom struggle in India, a revolutionary institution was established in 1915-16 in Uttarpura district Mainpuri whose main center was Aryapur Patti, mainpuri. Mukundi Lal, Pt. Dammilal Pandey, Karorilal Gupta, Siddha Gopal Chaturvedi, Gopinath, Prabhakar Pandey, Chandrodhar Johari and Shiv Kishan etc. joined hands with Shivaji Committee to work against the British under the leadership of Pandit Gendalal Dikshit, a resident of Aaraia district Etawah and one Establishment of new institution Matravedi. The British officials were informed about the work of this organization secretly and they got a lawsuit in Mainpuri against them by catching the top leaders. This is what later the British called Mainpuri Conspiracy. These revolutionaries were imprisoned for different times.
The specialty of Mainpuri conspiracy was that it was planned mainly by residents of Uttar Pradesh. If the Dalit gangster Dalpat Singh, the only traitor of Mainpuri in this organization, had not made the request to the English Government, then the party was not going to break or break so early. Mukundilal was sentenced to life imprisonment while Ram Prasad 'Bismil' was hanged as he was also the leader of the Matrivedi Dal who planned to rescind Gendalal Dikshit from the fort of Agra in Mainpuri Kand. If these people were successful in their campaign, then in 1927, promising young people like Rajendra Lahdi and Ashfaq Ulla Khan would be hanged, nor would there have been countless murders in the year 1931, like Sharad Shaker Azad, a sharp journalist like Nar Nahr and Ganesh Shankar Vidyarthi. Background

Due to British atrocities and severe repression policy, India was struggling to face gruesome dissatisfaction in the year. The blood of the youth began to rise against foreign power. They were growing enthusiasm for eradicating foreign rule. The only combined province of British India (the United Kingdom of Agra and Awadh) of those days, which was named after Uttar Pradesh after 1947, was not behind anyone in this zeal. The revolutionary movement in Uttar Pradesh was originally started by some Bengali revolutionaries living in Benaras but according to the well-known revolutionary and writer Manmathnath Gupta, the Mainpuri Kand was an autonomous movement, with the inspiration of many young patriots in Uttar Pradesh, this kind of armed revolution. Attracted. Many districts of Uttar Pradesh, including Shahjahanpur, Agra, Mainpuri, Etawah and Etta could not live without its influence with the fire. It exploded as the Mainpuri conspiracy of 1918.

Aryapur Khera is maternal hometown of Kannauj BJP member of parliament Shri Shubrat Pathak.Villagers cherish his political success greatly and want him to reach new heights.

Places of interest
The village has some very old and popular Hindu temples, Mosque and Jain Temple .

Markets
Munshi ji ki Dukaan,
Babu Ki Dukaan,
Hari Halwai,
Radhe Kachaudi wale,
Pilli,
Karua Bhujji,
Makhanne Pansaari,

Bakari ka bajar : It is located in main market. This Bakri bazar is Establish in 1930 Founder Name Shri Gc Saxena

Sunaar Gali : It is famous jewelry market.

Galla mandi : Village holds 2 major galla mandi.

Cloth Destination : This village attract several people for cloth destination. This is right destination for cloth purchase.

Village holds famous temples:
Mahadevo Mandir (Lord Shiva's Temple), It is near to bypass.
Devi Mandir (Durga's Temple), It is in front on Mahadevo mandir OR near to bypass.
Kali Mandir, It is located at bypass, near Shivapalpur village.
Shri Narmadeshwar Mahadev Mandir, It is located at tempo station, near to Alipur Patti.
Main tiraha Alipur khera

Mainpuri district
Mainpuri is also known for sarus crane (Grus antigone). The sarus crane is the only crane species that resides and breeds in India.  It is the world's tallest flying bird. There are three subspecies of sarus crane known worldwide.  This bird, called krouncha in India, is revered as a symbol of marital fidelity and is celebrated in myth and legend.  There are estimated to be 8,000–10,000 sarus cranes in India. Two third of its population resides in Karhal.

Post office details
The post offices are : 
Office Name: Alipur Khera B.O
Pincode: 205262
Status: Branch Office (Delivery) directly a/w Head Office
Head Office: Mainpuri H.O
Location: Bhongaon Tahasil of Mainpuri District
SPCC: Mainpuri-205001
Postal Department Information: Mainpuri Division Agra Region Uttar Pradesh Circle

Education

The educational institutions are
 Gyan Gaurav Academy, near to bypass, Aryapur Khera
 Indian Public School, near to Manikpur, Aryapur Khera
 Gyanodaya public school, near to Jain mandir, Aryapur Khera.
 Lok kalyan inter college and lok kalyan ashram, Aryapur Khera.

Colleges and degree colleges
 D.A.V. Inter College, Aryapur khera
 Lok kalyan inter college, Aryapur khera
 Bansidhar sarda devi maha vidhyalaya, Aryapur khera

NGOs

Lok Kalyan Ashram, Aryapur Khera, Mainpuri.
Neelkamal Educational and Welfare Society, Aryapur Khera
R.Dayal bricks store and social welfare (Alipur khera)

Geography

It has an average elevation of 153 metres (501 ft).

Demographics
 India census, Mainpuri had a population of 89,535. Males constitute 53% of the population and females 47%. Mainpuri has an average literacy rate of 69%, higher than the national average of 59.5%: male literacy is 74%, and female literacy is 64%. In Mainpuri, 15% of the population is under 6 years of age. People speak Kannauji in day to day communication.

Some very popular markets include Laneganj, Devi Road, Old Tehsil Road, Agra Road etc. known for Agro Commodities, handicrafts etc. Mainpuri today has population of over 1 Lakh in city and over 15 Lakhs as District.

References

External links
 Mainpuri District official web site
 

chanchal pal s/o Rajendra singh pal alipur khera mainpuri

Villages in Mainpuri district